At least two classes of frigates have been named Thetis after their lead ship:

, a pair of steam frigates built for British Royal Navy in the 1840s and then sold to the Prussian Navy
, three patrol vessels of the Royal Danish Navy built in the late 1980s and early 1990s